Vašíček (feminine Vašíčková) is a Czech surname, a diminutive or nickname from . Notable people include:

 Antonín Vašíček (1903–1966), Czech physician
 Caroline Vasicek (born 1974), Austrian actress
 Jiří Vašíček (born 1980), Czech ice hockey player
 John Vasicek (born 1974), American filmmaker
 Josef Vašíček (1980-2011), Czech ice hockey player
 Michael Vašíček (born 1979), German ice hockey player
 Oldřich Vašíček (born 1942), Czech mathematician
 Václav Vašíček (born 1991), Czech footballer
 Vic Vasicek (born 1926), American football player
 Vladimír Vašíček (1919-2003), Czech painter

Other meanings 
 Vasicek model, a mathematical model, named after Oldřich.
 Origin of name: a little (cek) vaclav (named after King Vaclav, also known as King Wenceslas, the first Christian king of Bohemia and patron saint)

Czech-language surnames